Germany competed at the 1928 Summer Olympics in Amsterdam, Netherlands. Germany returned to the Olympic Games after not being invited to both the 1920 and 1924 Games. Despite a total absence of 16 years since 1912, German athletes were ranked 2nd. 295 competitors, 260 men and 35 women, took part in 95 events in 16 sports.

Medalists

Athletics

Women's 100 metres

Erna Steinberg – 4th
Leni Schmidt – DQ (final)
Anni Holdmann – Semi-final (4th in heat 1)
Leni Junker – Semi-final (5th in heat 2)

Boxing

Men's Flyweight (– 50.8 kg)
 Hubert Ausbock
 First Round — Bye
 Second Round — Defeated Lennart Bohman (SWE), points
 Quarterfinals — Lost to Antal Kocsis (HUN), points

Men's Heavyweight (+ 79.4 kg)
 Hans Schonrath
 First Round — Bye
 Quarterfinals — Lost to Nils Ramm (SWE), points

Cycling

Ten cyclists, all men, represented Germany in 1928.

Individual road race
 Karl Koch
 Arthur Essing
 Bernhard Stübecke
 Otto Kürschner

Sprint
 Hans Bernhardt

Time trial
 Kurt Einsiedel

Tandem
 Karl Köther
 Hans Bernhardt

Team pursuit
 Josef Steger
 Anton Joksch
 Kurt Einsiedel
 Hans Dormbach

Diving

Equestrian

Fencing

13 fencers, 10 men and 3 women, represented Germany in 1928.

Men's foil
 Erwin Casmir
 Fritz Gazzera
 Julius Thomson

Men's team foil
 Erwin Casmir, Fritz Gazzera, Julius Thomson, Wilhelm Löffler, August Heim, Heinrich Moos

Men's épée
 Hans Halberstadt
 Fritz Jack
 Theodor Fischer

Men's team épée
 Theodor Fischer, Fritz Gazzera, Hans Halberstadt, Fritz Jack

Men's sabre
 Erwin Casmir
 Hans Thomson
 Heinrich Moos

Men's team sabre
 Erwin Casmir, Heinrich Moos, Hans Halberstadt, Hans Thomson

Women's foil
 Helene Mayer
 Olga Oelkers
 Erna Sondheim

Football

Hockey

Roster

 Group play

Bronze Medal Match

Modern pentathlon

Three male pentathletes represented Germany in 1928. Helmuth Kahl won a bronze medal.

 Helmuth Kahl
 Heinz Hax
 Hermann Hölter

Rowing

Sailing

Swimming

Water Polo

Weightlifting

Wrestling

Art competitions

References

External links
Official Olympic Reports
International Olympic Committee results database

Nations at the 1928 Summer Olympics
1928
Summer Olympics